Camille Imart (born 11 January 1995 in Castres) is a French international rugby union player. She plays Fly Half for Stade Toulousain and the France national  team.

She competed at the 2016 Women's Six Nations Championship, 2019 Women's Rugby Super Series, 2020 Women's Six Nations Championship, and 2021 Women's Six Nations Championship.

Career 
Her grandfather, Claude, played in Castres before participating in the creation of Soual Olympique. Her father, Yannick, also played for Castres and Soual. She started rugby at the age of 9 with the boys of Sor-Agout XV, a club born from the merger of Soual Olympique and Rugby Club Saïx-Longuegineste. In 2008, she joined the of the Jolimont1 high school. She then joined Saint-Orens women's rugby.

In 2015, she left this club, which became Blagnac Saint-Orens women's rugby, to join the neighboring club Stade toulousain women's rugby.

She had her first cap for the French women's rugby union team against Italy on the first day of the 2016 Women's Six Nations Tournament. As a substitute, she entered the game in the 66th minute.

On 13 May 2018, she played in the French championship final, starting at the opening, with Stade Toulouse against Montpellier. The Toulousains lost 15 to 12 at the Stade Albert-Domec in Carcassonne.

She returned to the French team on 2 February 2019, starting at the opening against Wales, on the first day of the 2019 Women's Six Nations Tournament.

On 18 May 2019, she played again in the final of the French championship, starting at the opening, with Stade Toulouse against Montpellier. The Toulouse lost again (22-13) at the Stade Maurice-Trélut in Tarbes.

References 

Living people
1995 births
French rugby union players